Corinne Mucha is a Chicago based cartoonist, illustrator, and teaching artist. Her comics work includes the Xeric funded "My Alaskan Summer," the Ignatz award-winning "The Monkey in the Basement and Other Delusions," and the young adult graphic novel "Freshman: Tales of 9th Grade Obsessions, Revelations and Other Nonsense".

Early life and education 
Corinne Mucha was born in 1983 and grew up in southern New Jersey. She graduated with a degree in illustration from Rhode Island School of Design in 2005.

Works 

 "My Alaskan Summer," 2008, 96 pages, self-published through a Xeric grant
 "My Every Single Thought," 2009, self-published
 "Freshman: Tales of 9th Grade Obsessions, Revelations, and Other Nonsense," 2011, 112 pages, published by Zest Books/ Houghton Mifflin
 "The Monkey in the Basement and Other Delusions," 2012, published by Retrofit Comics
 "Get Over It!" 2014, 106 pages, published by Secret Acres, 
 "The Girl Who Was Mostly Attracted to Ghosts," published by Secret Acres
 "It Doesn't Exist," published by Secret Acres
 "Get Over It!" published by Secret Acres
 "Fixated," published by Secret Acres

Recognition

Grants and awards 

 Ignatz award, "The Monkey in the Basement and Other Delusions," 2012
 Xeric Foundation grant, "My Alaskan Summer," 2008

Reviews 

 "Panel Mania: Corinne Mucha and the Post Break-Up Blues," Publishers Weekly, April 16, 2014
 "9 Signs You're Over Your Ex: Corinne Mucha's "Get Over It!" is a balm for the heartbroken," BuzzFeed, May 19, 2014
 "Sink or Swim: Corinne Mucha Strives to “Get Over It,” LA Review of Books, December 27, 2014

References 

Living people
Year of birth missing (living people)